William Savage is an American former Negro league pitcher who played in the 1940s.

Savage played for the Memphis Red Sox in 1940. In three recorded appearances on the mound, he posted a 4.09 ERA over 11 innings.

References

External links
 and Seamheads

Year of birth missing
Place of birth missing
Memphis Red Sox players
Baseball pitchers